The World Trade Centre was an , 19 storey building in the Canary Wharf area of London, England, built in 1991. The building was heavily damaged by an IRA bomb on February 9, 1996. The top four floors were demolished and after a proposal called World Trade Centre London to redevelop it as offices was cancelled following September 11, 2001, the frame was reclad and it became the Hilton Canary Wharf.

See also
 South Quay DLR station
 1996 Docklands bombing

Notes and references

External links
 CNN: IRA claims responsibility for London bombing
 BBC News - IRA Bombing, On This Day, February 10, 1996.

London
Former skyscrapers
Skyscrapers in the London Borough of Tower Hamlets
Former buildings and structures in the London Borough of Tower Hamlets
Buildings and structures in the London Borough of Tower Hamlets
Skyscraper office buildings in London
Millwall